The Golden Screen Award, formerly known as the Golden Reel Award, is a Canadian film award, presented to the Canadian film with the biggest box office gross of the year. The Canadian Motion Picture Distributors Association introduced this award in 1976 as part of the Canadian Film Awards until 1979. The Golden Reel became part of the Genie Awards ceremonies in 1980, and is currently part of the Canadian Screen Awards. It was renamed from Golden Reel to Golden Screen as of the 3rd Canadian Screen Awards in 2015.

As the economics of Canadian film production mean that the year's top-grossing Canadian film is often a francophone film from Quebec, the award often (although not always) went to the same film as the Billet d'or ("Golden Ticket"), which was presented by the Prix Iris to the top-grossing film from Quebec until that award was replaced by the fan-voted Public Prize in 2016.

In 2015, the Academy also introduced Golden Screen Awards for fiction and reality television, to honour the highest-rated Canadian television shows in each category.

Winners

Film
 1976 - Lies My Father Told Me
 1977 - Why Shoot the Teacher?
 1978 - Who Has Seen the Wind
 1979 - Meatballs
 1980 - The Changeling
 1981 - Heavy Metal
 1982 - Porky's
 1983 - Strange Brew
 1984 - The Dog Who Stopped the War (La Guerre des tuques)
 1985 - The Care Bears Movie
 1986 - The Decline of the American Empire (Le Déclin de l'empire américain)
 1987 - The Gate
 1988 - The Tadpole and the Whale (La Grenouille et la baleine)
 1989 - Jesus of Montreal
 1990 - Ding et Dong, le film
 1991 - Black Robe
 1992 - La Florida
 1993 - Louis 19, King of the Airwaves (Louis 19, le roi des ondes)
 1994 - Johnny Mnemonic
 1995 - Crash
 1996 - Air Bud
 1997 - not awarded this year
 1998 - Les Boys
 1999 - Les Boys II
 2000 - The Art of War
 2001 - Wedding Night (Nuit de noces)
 2002 - Les Boys III
 2003 - Séraphin: Heart of Stone (Séraphin: Un homme et son péché)
 2004 - Resident Evil: Apocalypse
 2005 - C.R.A.Z.Y.
 2006 - Bon Cop, Bad Cop
 2007 - The 3 L'il Pigs (Les 3 p'tits cochons)
 2008 - Passchendaele
 2009 - Father and Guns (De père en flic)
 2010 - Resident Evil: Afterlife
 2011 - Starbuck
 2012 - Resident Evil: Retribution
 2013 - The Mortal Instruments: City of Bones
 2014 - Pompeii
 2015 - Snowtime! (La Guerre des tuques 3D)
 2016 - The 3 L'il Pigs 2 (Les 3 p'tits cochons 2)
 2017 - Father and Guns 2 (De père en flic 2)
 2018 - 1991
 2019 - Compulsive Liar (Menteur)
 2021 - PAW Patrol: The Movie

Television
 2014 - Rookie Blue (fiction), The Amazing Race Canada (reality)
 2015 - Corner Gas: The Movie (fiction), The Amazing Race Canada (reality)
 2016 - Murdoch Mysteries (fiction), The Amazing Race Canada (reality)
 2017 - Murdoch Mysteries (fiction), The Amazing Race Canada (reality)
 2018 - The Indian Detective (fiction), The Amazing Race Canada (reality)
 2019 - Murdoch Mysteries and Private Eyes (fiction), The Amazing Race Canada (reality)

See also
Prix Iris Public Prize

References

Genie Awards
Canadian Screen Award film categories
Canadian Screen Award television categories